Bhul is a community that resides in the hilly region of Nepal. Bhul is one of the four castes in far-western region of Nepal  (Rosyara, Paneru, Chhetri and Bhul being the others).

References

Bibliography

 

Caste system in Nepal